is a railway station in the city of Sakata, Yamagata, Japan, operated by East Japan Railway Company (JR East).

Lines
Sagoshi Station is served by the Uetsu Main Line and is located 160.4 rail kilometers from the starting point of that line at Niitsu Station. Trains of the Rikuu West Line also continue past the nominal terminus of that line at Amarume Station towards , stopping at this station en route.

Station layout
Sagoshi Station has two opposed side platforms connected by a footbridge. The station is unstaffed.

Platforms

History
Sagoshi Station opened on December 24, 1914. With the privatization of Japanese National Railways (JNR) on April 1, 1987, the station came under the control of JR East.

Surrounding area
former Hirata Town Hall

See also
 List of railway stations in Japan

External links

 JR East station information 

Stations of East Japan Railway Company
Railway stations in Japan opened in 1914
Railway stations in Yamagata Prefecture
Uetsu Main Line
Sakata, Yamagata